The Tula Oblast Duma is the regional parliament of Tula Oblast, a federal subject of Russia. A total of 36 deputies are elected for five-year terms.

Elections

2019

References

Tula Oblast
Politics of Tula Oblast